Clinton Dawkins may refer to:
Clinton Edward Dawkins (1859–1905), British businessman and civil servant
Clinton Richard Dawkins (born 1941), British scientist